Channel 68 refers to several television stations:

Canada
The following television stations broadcast on analog channel 68 (UHF frequencies covering 794-800 MHz) in Canada:
 CISR-TV in Santa Rosa, British Columbia

See also
 Channel 68 virtual TV stations in the United States

68